Vadadustat is an experimental medication which acts as a HIF prolyl-hydroxylase inhibitor and thereby increases endogenous production of erythropoietin, which stimulates production of hemoglobin and red blood cells. It is in Phase III clinical trials for the treatment of anemia caused by chronic kidney disease.

Society and culture

Legal status 
On 23 February 2023, the Committee for Medicinal Products for Human Use (CHMP) of the European Medicines Agency (EMA) adopted a positive opinion, recommending the granting of a marketing authorization for the medicinal product Vafseo, intended for the treatment of symptomatic anemia in adults with chronic kidney disease who are on chronic dialysis. The applicant for this medicinal product is Akebia Europe Limited.

References 

Acetic acids
Pyridines